DJ Charlie B is Canadian a disc jockey and record producer from Ontario. DJ Charlie B first gained recognition in 2011 when he released his first single "Reality", which saw him put together a collection of Toronto artists including P. Reign, Belly, Jahvon, and Big Lean. It was released on February 9, 2011. This brought Charlie into the spotlight of the rap industry. He released his debut album Across The Board in 2022 which included features from NorthSideBenji, Roy Woods, Pressa, Duvy, Lil Berete, Haviah Mighty, Smiley and others. In 2022, Charlie B joined Warner Music Canada as A&R Director. His single "30,000 ft" was nominated for a Juno in 2022.

Discography

Albums
2022: Across The Board

Singles
 2022: "30'000" (feat. NorthSideBenji) - Music Canada: Certified Gold

Awards and Nominations

|-
| 2022
| "30'000 feat" (feat. NorthSideBenji)
| Juno Award for Rap Single of the Year
| 
|}

References

Living people
Canadian hip hop record producers
Canadian male songwriters
Trap musicians
Canadian DJs
Canadian musicians of Indian descent